The Fighting Heart may refer to:

 The Fighting Heart (1919 film), directed by B. Reeves Eason
 The Fighting Heart (1925 film), directed by John Ford